Jan Hrnčíř (born 1 May 1977) is a Czech economist and politician.

Hrnčíř holds university degrees in economy (Ing.) from the Pan-European University in Bratislava and in ethics (PhDr.) from the University of International Business in Prešov and worked as a teacher of economics and business management.

He began his political career in TOP 09, and was a member of the party board on Blansko City Council. In 2014, he joined Dawn of Direct Democracy and unsuccessfully ran for the party in the 2014 municipal elections in Blansko. During the 2014 European Parliament election, he ran for Dawn again, but was not elected. He later joined Freedom and Direct Democracy, and was elected to the City Council. In the 2017 Czech legislative election he was elected to the Chamber of Deputies for SPD, representing the South Moravian Region. He is also SPD's chairman in South Moravia.

References 

1977 births
Living people
People from Ivančice
21st-century Czech politicians
Freedom and Direct Democracy MPs
TOP 09 politicians
Members of the Chamber of Deputies of the Czech Republic (2017–2021)
Members of the Chamber of Deputies of the Czech Republic (2021–2025)